Arizona Sky is a 2008 independent gay-themed romantic drama that was written, directed, and produced by Jeff London. Filmed in Lake Havasu City, Arizona and Bakersfield, California in the spirit of Brokeback Mountain, Arizona Sky follows the lives of two young men from rural America who fall in love as teenagers and find a way to rekindle that love later in life.

Plot
Arizona Sky is a romantic story of two high school buddies who reconnect with desire in their hearts. As the film opens, the teenagers Kyle and Jake are getting together for what appears to be a regular ritual of sleeping under the desert stars. The passions of first love are evident in these two young men. They eat some supper and then curl up on blankets for an evening of necking in the back of Kyle's truck. This happy interlude is at an end, as Jake is set to move with his dad to the big city.

Fifteen years pass and the film picks up with an adult Jake now a successful film producer with a stressed and loveless life. After an anxiety attack, Jake's assistant Brian urges him to take a break from all stresses for the first time in years, encouraging him that it's time to take a vacation and step back from his troubles. This is seconded by Jake's friend Steve, who agrees to accompany Jake to his hometown in Arizona to help him find himself and unwind.

Once more in Arizona, Jake finds Kyle's Aunt Elaine listed in the local phone book. Through her he finds that Kyle is a breakfast cook for a local diner as well as a ranch hand and mechanic with his cousin Heath. The two now-grown men reconnect and discover the spark is still there. Though Kyle is in the closet with his desires, all of his feelings spill to the surface as he and his old friend get to know each other better.

Cast
 Eric Dean as adult Jake
 Blaise Embry as young Jake
 Kyle Buckland as young Kyle
 Jayme McCabe as adult Kyle
 Patricia Place as Aunt Elaine
 Evan Cuthbert as Brian
 Brent King as Steve
 Emerson Smith as Heath
 Bernadette Murray as Cora

Reception
Arizona Sky was an official selection of the Philadelphia Gay and Lesbian International Film Festival. It was reviewed by Duane Simolke in "Twit Magazine" on October 28, 2008. The film has a wide release on DVD.

Additional sources
Philly Gay Calendar

References

External links
Arizona Sky on official Guardian Pictures website

2008 films
American independent films
American LGBT-related films
2008 independent films
Gay-related films
2000s English-language films
2000s American films